Sevenmile Creek is a stream in Preble County and Butler County, Ohio, in the United States. Sevenmile Creek is a tributary of Four Mile Creek. Beasley Run is a tributary of the creek.

Sevenmile Creek was named for its distance, from Fort Hamilton. Sevenmile Creek experienced major flooding during the Great Dayton Flood of 1913.

It is spanned by the Roberts Covered Bridge and other bridges.

Location

Mouth: Confluence with Four Mile Creek north of Hamilton at 
Origin: Preble County east of New Paris at

Flow rate
A USGS stream gauge on the creek at Sevenmile recorded a mean annual discharge of  during water years 1916-1920.

See also
List of rivers of Ohio

References

Rivers of Butler County, Ohio
Rivers of Preble County, Ohio
Rivers of Ohio
Tributaries of the Ohio River